Never Forget may refer to:

 "Never Forget" (Take That song), a 1995 song by Take That
 Never Forget (musical), a 2008 jukebox musical based on the songs of Take That
 Never Forget – The Ultimate Collection, an album by Take That
 Never Forget – The Ultimate Collection (DVD), a video compilation by Take That
 Never Forget (Alien Father album), 2007
 Never Forget (Where You Come From), an album by Bro'Sis
 "Never Forget" (Lena Katina song)
 "Never Forget" (Greta Salóme and Jónsi song), the 2012 Icelandic Eurovision entry
 Never Forget (1991 film), a TV film starring Leonard Nimoy

See also
 Never Forget You (disambiguation) 
 I'll Never Forget You (disambiguation)
 Never again
 Never Again (disambiguation)
 Lest We Forget (disambiguation)